Toivo Mäkelä (26 September 1909 – 20 April 1979) was a Finnish film actor, appearing in more than 50 films between 1951 and 1979. He won a Jussi Award for Best Actor in 1978 and was awarded a Pro Finlandia medal in 1960.

Partial filmography

 Pitkäjärveläiset (1951) - Mikko
 Noita palaa elämään (1952) - Hannu
 Kolmiapila (1953) - Drunken man
 Kovanaama (1954) - Anders - The Boss
 Sininen viikko (1954) -Bertel Forss
 Olemme kaikki syyllisiä (1954) - Doctor Heiskanen
 Nukkekauppias ja kaunis Lilith (1955) - Hovimestari (uncredited)
 Villi Pohjola (1955) - Valokuvaaja
 Viettelysten tie (1955) - Social worker
 The Harvest Month (1956) - Viktor Sundvall
 Pää pystyyn Helena (1957) - Eero Alanen
 Kuriton sukupolvi (1957) - Toimittaja Arvo Kääri
 Syntipukki (1957) - Lasse Aro
 Asessorin naishuolet (1958) - Tuomari Pakkola
 Verta käsissämme (1958) - Hovimestari
 Red Line (1959) - Jussi Kettuvaara
 Lasisydän (1959) - Psychiatrist / tramp
 Pekka ja Pätkä neekereinä (1960) - Dr. Pujoparta
 Justus järjestää kaiken (1960) - Manager
 Kaks' tavallista Lahtista (1960) - Managing clerk Puntti
 Kankkulan kaivolla (1960) - Nestori
 Komisario Palmun erehdys (1960) - Pianisti
 Autotytöt (1960) - Sailor
 Opettajatar seikkailee (1960) - Master Petäjä
 Minkkiturkki (1961) - Vilho, Head of "Valtakunnan rakennustoimisto"
 The Scarlet Dove (1961) - Maalaismies (uncredited)
 Olin nahjuksen vaimo (1961) - Judge Simolin
 Kaasua, komisario Palmu! (1961) - Lanne
 Kultainen vasikka (1961) - Herman Ahlroos
 Kuu on vaarallinen (1961) - Sten Lehtoja
 Hän varasti elämän (1962) - Kirkkoherra Evald Kettunen
 Naiset, jotka minulle annoit (1962) - Leo Luotola
 Vaarallista vapautta (1962) - Rainer
 Villin Pohjolan kulta (1963) - Pappi (uncredited)
 Turkasen tenava! (1963) - Ediatrician
 Pähkähullu Suomi (1967) - Prime minister
 Äl' yli päästä perhanaa (1968) - 	Arvi Jalmari Mattila / Iisalmen pastori / valtiopäivämies / Hannu Karppinen
 Aika hyvä ihmiseksi (1977) - Valokuvaaja Hurme
 Runoilija ja muusa (1978) - Old waiter

External links

1909 births
1979 deaths
People from Loviisa
People from Uusimaa Province (Grand Duchy of Finland)
Finnish male film actors
20th-century Finnish male actors